The 1999 Cricket World Cup (officially known as ICC Cricket World Cup '99) was the seventh edition of the Cricket World Cup, organised by the International Cricket Council (ICC). It was hosted primarily by England, with Scotland, Ireland, Wales and the Netherlands acting as co-hosts. The tournament was won by Australia, who beat Pakistan by 8 wickets in the final at Lord's Cricket Ground in London. New Zealand and South Africa were the other semi-finalists.

The tournament was hosted three years after the previous Cricket World Cup, deviating from the usual four-year gap.

Format
It featured 12 teams, playing a total of 42 matches. In the group stage, the teams were divided into two groups of six; each team played all the others in their group once. The top three teams from each group advanced to the Super Sixes, a new concept for the 1999 World Cup; each team carried forward the points from the games against the other qualifiers from their group and then played each of the qualifiers from the other group (in other words, each qualifier from Group A played each qualifier from Group B and vice versa). The top four teams in the Super Sixes advanced to the semi-finals.

Qualification

The 1999 World Cup featured 12 teams, which was the same as the previous edition in 1996. The hosts England and the eight other test nations earned automatic qualification to the World Cup. The remaining three spots were decided at the 1997 ICC Trophy in Malaysia.

22 nations competed in the 1997 edition of the ICC Trophy. After going through two group stages, the semi-finals saw Kenya and Bangladesh qualify through to the World Cup. Scotland would be the third nation to qualify as they defeated Ireland in the third-place playoff.

Venues

England

Outside England
Scotland played two of their Group B matches in their home country becoming the first associate nation to host games in a World Cup. One Group B match was played in Wales and Ireland respectively, while one Group A match was played in the Netherlands.

Squads

Group stage

Group A

Group B

Super Six
Teams who qualified for the Super Six stage only played against the teams from the other group; results against the other teams from the same group were carried forward to this stage. Results against the non-qualifying teams were therefore discarded at this point.

As a result of League match losses against New Zealand and Pakistan, even though Australia finished second in their group, they progressed to the Super Six stage with no points carried forward (PCF). India faced similar circumstances, finishing 2nd in their group but carrying forward 0 points after losing to fellow qualifiers Zimbabwe and South Africa.

During their super six clash, Pakistan and India were officially at war at the time of their match, the only time this has ever happened in the history of the sport.

Semi-finals

Final

Statistics

Lance Klusener of South Africa was declared the Player of the Tournament. Rahul Dravid of India scored the most runs (461) in the tournament. Geoff Allott of New Zealand and Shane Warne of Australia tied each other for most wickets taken (20) in the tournament.

Match balls

A new type of cricket ball, the white 'Duke', was introduced for the first time in the 1999 World Cup. British Cricket Balls Ltd claimed that the balls behaved identically to the balls used in previous World Cups, experiments showed they were harder and swung more.

Media

The host broadcasters for television coverage of the tournament were Sky and BBC Television. In the UK, live games were divided between the broadcasters, with both screening the final live. This was to be BBC's last live cricket coverage during that summer, with all of England's home Test series being shown on Channel 4 or Sky from 1999 onwards; the BBC did not show any live cricket again until August 2020.

References and notes

External links
 Cricket World Cup 1999 Scorecards in CricketFundas
 Cricket World Cup 1999 from Cricinfo

 
1999
World Cup
1999 in Irish sport
1999 in Dutch sport
1999 in Scottish sport
International sports competitions in Edinburgh
International cricket competitions from 1997–98 to 2000
International cricket competitions in England
International cricket competitions in Ireland
International cricket competitions in the Netherlands
International cricket competitions in Scotland
International cricket competitions in Wales
May 1999 sports events in Europe
June 1999 sports events in Europe